Intrahepatic bile ducts compose the outflow system of exocrine bile product from the liver.

They can be divided into:
 Lobar ducts (right and left hepatic ducts) - stratified columnar epithelium.
 Interlobar ducts (between the main hepatic ducts and the interlobular ducts) - pseudostratified columnar epithelium.
 Interlobular bile ducts (between the interlobar ducts and the lobules) - simple columnar epithelium.
 Intralobular bile ducts (cholangioles or Canals of Hering) - simple cuboidal epithelium, then by hepatocytes
 Bile canaliculi - two half-canaliculi formed by the hepatocytes facing the perisinusoidal space

References

Hepatology